Gerlingen (Swabian: Gaerlenge) is a town in the district of Ludwigsburg, Baden-Württemberg, Germany. It is situated 9 km west of Stuttgart, and 15 km southwest of Ludwigsburg. Gerlingen is home to Bosch, a major engineering and electronics company.

Geography 
Gerlingen is the southernmost district of Ludwigsburg, neighboring the town of Ditzingen to the north, the district of Stuttgart to the east, and the town of Leonberg to the west.

The urban area is split between two distinct parts.  In the north, a part of the Neckar Basin which is predominantly agricultural.  In the south, the Gelmswald and hills to the western border with Leonberg.

History

Early History 
Paleolithic history is largely unknown beyond three pieces of mammoth tooth found during a construction project in 1955.  Evidence of Linear pottery culture of the early Neolithic were found in 1972 when potsherds as well as other rocks, bones, and fire equipment were found.

Twin towns
 Vesoul, France, (1964)
 Tata, Hungary, (1987)
 Seaham, United Kingdom, (1988)

Sons and daughters of the city 

 Johannes Rebmann (1820-1876), missionary, linguist and geographer, 1848 "Discoverer" of Kilimanjaro
 Rainer Wieland (born 1957), lawyer and politician (CDU), Vice-President of the European Parliament
 Smudo (born 1968), birth name Michael Schmidt, singer of the band Die Fantastischen Vier
 Laurents Hörr (born 1997), racing driver

References

External links

Ludwigsburg (district)
Württemberg